The 1947–48 Illinois Fighting Illini men's basketball team represented the University of Illinois.

Regular season
After 11 seasons that included three Big Ten Conference championships and a trip to the NCAA tournament, Doug Mills removed himself as head coach of the Fighting Illini, however; he remained as the University of Illinois athletic director until 1966.  Replacing Mills was a former Illini player, Harry Combes. Combes was a senior during Mills' first season with the Fighting Illini, a team that won the conference championship. During Combes' 20 years as head coach, the Illini won 316 games while losing only 150, a .678 winning percentage.  During conference play, his teams won 174 times while only losing 104 games.  Combes still owns several Illini coaching records including winning 4 conference championships.  Combes most significant feat over his 20 years was back-to-back NCAA tournament third-place finishes in 1951 and 1952. Combes came to Illinois after spending five seasons at Champaign High School where he served as boys basketball and baseball coach.  While at Champaign High School, from 1939 to 1947, he compiled an impressive of 254-46 record in basketball and an equally substantial baseball record of 70-26-2 (.724) over a five-year period (1937–1942).

With the 'Whiz Kids' gone, a fresh start with a couple of All-American athletes was the focus for the new head coach.  Bill Erickson, Dwight Eddleman, Jack Burmaster, Wally Osterkorn, Fred Green, Burdette Thurlby and Jim Marks returned from a team that finished with an overall record of 14-6, placing second in the Big Ten.

Roster

Source

Schedule

|-
!colspan=12 style="background:#DF4E38; color:white;"| Non-Conference regular season

|- align="center" bgcolor=""

|-
!colspan=9 style="background:#DF4E38; color:#FFFFFF;"|Big Ten regular season

Bold Italic connotes conference game
												
Source

Player stats

Awards and honors
 Dwight Eddleman
Associated Press 2nd team All-American (1948)
Converse 3rd team All-American (1948)
True Magazine 3rd team All-American (1948)
Fighting Illini All-Century team (2005)
Jack Burmaster
Converse Honorable Mention All-American (1948)
Team Most Valuable Player

Team players drafted into the NBA

References

Illinois Fighting Illini
Illinois Fighting Illini men's basketball seasons
1947 in sports in Illinois
1948 in sports in Illinois